Happendon railway station served the settlement of Happendon, South Lanarkshire, Scotland, from 1864 to 1964 on the Douglas Branch.

History 
The station was opened as Douglas on 1 April 1864 by the Caledonian Railway. It was a terminus until Muirkirk opened to the south. Although it was initially named Douglas, the village of the same name was 3 miles to the southwest. It had two signal boxes, one to the east end of the eastbound platform and the other behind the middle of the westbound platform. On the south side was the goods yard. The station's name was changed to Happendon on 1 April 1931. The station closed on 5 October 1964.

References 

Disused railway stations in South Lanarkshire
Former Caledonian Railway stations
Railway stations in Great Britain opened in 1864
Railway stations in Great Britain closed in 1964
1864 establishments in Scotland
1964 disestablishments in Scotland